This is a list of castles, fortifications and schlösser in the Eifel mountains covering the period from the Celts to the Early Modern Period. The list covers the area bounded by the cities of Aachen, Bonn, Koblenz and Trier, and extends in places into  Luxembourg and Belgium.

List

References

Literature 
 
 Dirk Holtermann, Holger A. Dux: Die Dürener Burgenrunde. Radeln zwischen Rur und Eifel. Bouvier, Bonn 2001, .
 Dirk Holtermann, Harald Herzog: Die Euskirchener Burgenrunde. Radeln zwischen Erft und Eifel. Walter Rau, Düsseldorf, 2000, 
 Matthias Kordel: Die schönsten Schlösser und Burgen in der Eifel. Wartberg, Gudensberg-Gleichen, 1999, .
 Karl Emerich Krämer: Von Burg zu Burg durch die Eifel. 4th edition. Mercator, Duisburg, 1986, .
 Michael Losse: Burgen und Schlösser, Adelssitze und Befestigungen in der Vulkaneifel. Michael Imhof, Petersberg, 2012. .
 Michael Losse: Burgen und Schlösser in der Eifel. Regionalia, Rheinbach 2013, .
 Michael Losse: "Keck und fest, mit senkrechten Mauertürmen ... wie eine Krone". Burgen, Schlösser und Fortressen an der Ahr und im Adenauer Land. 1st edition. Schnell & Steiner, Regensburg, 2008, .
 Michael Losse: Theiss Burgenführer. Hohe Eifel und Ahrtal. Theiss, Stuttgart, 2003, .

External links 

 Castles of the Eifel
 Castles, schlösser and Ruins in the Vulkaneifel
 List of Castles and Schlösser at eifel.de
 Castles and schlösser at eifelfuehrer.de

Eifel